USS Brumby (FF-1044) was a  destroyer escort (and later a frigate) in the US Navy. She was named after Admiral Frank H. Brumby. The ship was in US Navy service from 5 August 1965 to 31 March 1989 and was in Pakistan Navy service from 1989 to 1994 as Harbah.

History 
Brumby was built in the early 1960s, and during the Vietnam War served in the Atlantic. 'Her keel was laid down at Avondale Shipyards, Louisiana on 1 August 1963. She was launched and Christened 6 June 1963 and co-sponsored by Adm. Brumby's granddaughters, Misses Muriel Tuckerman Fitzgerald and Cornelia Truxtun Fitzgerald. Brumby was commissioned at Charleston 5 August 1965.

Brumby deployed to northern Europe and the Mediterranean Sea in 1967. The ship visited Oslo, Norway, Kiel, Germany, Norrköping, Sweden, El Ferrol del Caudillo, Spain, Naples, Italy, Valletta, Malta, and Castellammare del Golfo, Sicily. Brumby was towed to Portmouth Norfolk Naval Shipyard on or about January1968 and remained until her boilers were repaired. Brumby departed Norfolk November 1968 to return to homeport Newport RI. In January 1969 Brumby departed Newport en route to GITMO for refresher training. One weekend while moored off of Guantanamo Bay Brumby sonar dome became damaged by the anchor chain. Brumby completed training late February early March then sailed to the Boston shipyard drydock to have sonar dome repaired.

Brumby departed Naval Station Mayport 28 November 1970 for a Mediterranean Deployment, returning 3 May 1971. The ship visited Bermuda, Ponta Delgada, Azores, Rota, Spain, Souda Bay, Crete, Piraeus, Greece, Augusta Bay, Sicily, Valletta, Malta, Split, Yugoslavia, Palermo, Sicily, Palma, Majorca, Naples, Italy and Barcelona, Spain. Brumby spent several weeks, around the New Year, shadowing the Soviet helicopter carrier Leningrad.

While deployed in 1972, Brumby experienced a boiler casualty and was towed from Scotland by  arriving in Charleston, SC, 15 November 1972. The cause of the boilers rupturing a total of 36 of its steam tubes (these carry the steam from the water drum where the water is boiled to the main engines and other steam driven equipment) was due to a failure of the engineering department to properly monitor and maintain the required level of chlorides in the system. Chlorides cause chloride stress corrosion in stainless steel components. The level of chlorides should be less than 1 PPM (parts per million) and the level in the system was over 16;000 PPM.

Brumby deployed to South America 21 July 1975 to 8 December 1975. The ship visited Cartagena, Colombia, Chile, Montevideo and Rio de Janeiro.

Brumby received the Navy Expeditionary Medal for service relating to Iran / Indian Ocean, in 1980.

Brumby received the Navy Expeditionary Medal for service relating to Lebanon in 1983.

In 1984, Brumby deployed to the Mediterranean and Indian Ocean returning in November 1984. Brumby was selected to join the 29th activation of NATO's Naval on Call Force – Mediterranean (NAVOCFORMED), a predecessor to Standing NATO Maritime Group 2. The force was activated at Ancona, Italy and included the Italian frigate , the Turkish destroyer Piyalepasa (ex-),  and the Greek destroyer Sachtouris (ex-). During the deployment, the ship also visited Puerto Cortés, Honduras, Rota, Spain, Monaco, Nice, Naples and others. The ship transited the Suez Canal and spent 102 continuous days at sea during the deployment.

Brumby received the Coast Guard Unit Commendation for winter law enforcement operations from 1 November 1985 to 28 February 1986.

Brumby received the Coast Guard Meritorious Unit Commendation for 1 October 1986 to 30 June 1987.

Fate 
On 31 March 1989 Brumby was decommissioned and leased to the Pakistan Navy the same day, where she was commissioned as Harbah. However, following Pakistan's refusal to halt its nuclear weapons program, the lease was cancelled in 1994. She was returned to United States custody on 9 September 1994 and stricken from the Navy Register the same day. Brumby was sold for scrapping for $635,602.50 ($ today) on 9 September 1994 to Trusha Investments Pte. Ltd.

References 
 

 

Garcia-class frigates
Ships built in Bridge City, Louisiana
1964 ships
Cold War frigates and destroyer escorts of the United States